Óscar Medina (21 May 1917 – 10 January 1984) was a Chilean footballer. He played in six matches for the Chile national football team in 1942. He was also part of Chile's squad for the 1942 South American Championship.

References

External links
 

1917 births
1984 deaths
Chilean footballers
Chile international footballers
Place of birth missing
Association football midfielders
Colo-Colo footballers